Cesar Gaudard (21 January 1915 – 28 August 1997) was a Swiss wrestler. He competed in the men's freestyle bantamweight at the 1936 Summer Olympics.

References

1915 births
1997 deaths
Swiss male sport wrestlers
Olympic wrestlers of Switzerland
Wrestlers at the 1936 Summer Olympics
Place of birth missing